Geophilus monoporus is a species of soil centipede in the family Geophilidae found in Tiba, Japan. It grows up to 18 millimeters in length; it's named for the single pore at the base of the final leg pair.

References

monoporus
Zoology
Arthropods of Asia